Queens of Drama is an American scripted reality drama television series. The series follows former daytime and primetime soap stars who form a production company to develop and produce of a new serialized drama pilot for television. It stars Lindsay Hartley, Crystal Hunt, Vanessa Marcil, Chrystee Pharris, and Hunter Tylo, along with Donna Mills as a fictionalized version of herself. Mills stars as a no-nonsense queen bee of the group. The series debuted on Pop on April 26, 2015. Ten episodes reached air.

Cast
Lindsay Hartley
Crystal Hunt
Vanessa Marcil
Chrystee Pharris
Hunter Tylo
Donna Mills

Joan Collins also guest starred on the series.

Episodes

References

External links 
 

2010s American television series
2015 American television series debuts
2015 American television series endings
English-language television shows
American television soap operas
Television shows set in Los Angeles
Pop (American TV channel) original programming